Lispocephala is a very large genus of true flies of the family Muscidae.

Description
frons are broad in both sexes. There are two orbital setae and two frontal setae on each fronta-orbital plate.

Biology
The biology of the genus is, at present unknown, only a pupa of one species (L. alma) has been described.
Some Lispocephala are known to be specialized predators on Drosophilidae in the Hawaiian Islands.

Species
L. alma (Meigen, 1826)
L. bistriata (Stein, 1908)
L. brachialis (Rondani, 1877)
L. erythrocera (Robineau-Desvoidy, 1830)
L. falculata Collin, 1963
L. fuscitibia Ringdahl, 1944
L. mikii (Strobl, 1893)
L. pallipalpis (Zetterstedt, 1845)
L. rubricornis (Zetterstedt, 1849)
L. spuria (Zetterstedt, 1838)
L. ungulata (Rondani, 1866)
L. verna (Fabricius, 1794)

References

Muscidae
Diptera of Europe
Brachycera genera